The 1500 metres distance for women in the 2009–10 ISU Speed Skating World Cup was contested over six races on six occasions, out of a total of seven World Cup occasions for the season, with the first occasion taking place in Berlin, Germany, on 6–8 November 2009, and the final occasion taking place in Heerenveen, Netherlands, on 12–14 March 2010.

Kristina Groves of Canada successfully defended her title from the previous season, while fellow Canadian Christine Nesbitt came second, and Martina Sáblíková of the Czech Republic came third.

Top three

Race medallists

Final standings
Standings as of 14 March 2010 (end of the season).

References

Women 1500
ISU